The discography of American R&B and soul singer Keke Wyatt consists of five studio albums, two unreleased albums, twelve singles, four collaborations and nine music videos. Wyatt has had three record deals with MCA Records, Shanachie Records and her own record label Aratek Entertainment distributed through INgrooves Music Group.

She released her debut album, Soul Sista on November 13, 2001, through MCA Records. The album peaked at number 33 on the Billboard 200, number 5 on the Top R&B/Hip-Hop Albums chart and was certified gold by the Recording Industry Association of America (RIAA). Her debut single "Used to Love" (2001) peaked at number 65 on the US Hot R&B/Hip-Hop Songs chart. Her second single "Nothing in This World" (2001) with singer Avant peaked at number 27 on the US Billboard Hot 100. Her third single "I Don't Wanna" (2002) failed to chart in the United States.

In 2005, she released the single "Put Your Hands on Me", which was set to be included on her second studio album Emotional Rollercoaster. The album was planned to be released on May 31, 2005, through Cash Money Records/Universal Motown Records but after two postponed release dates, the release was cancelled altogether. In 2007, she released the single "Ghetto Rose" from her second album, which was to have the same title as the single. The album was set for release on October 23, 2007, through TVT Records but was postponed for release in early 2008. In February 2008, the record label filed for bankruptcy, which resulted in Wyatt's album being shelved.

She released her second studio album, Who Knew?, on February 23, 2010, through Shanachie Records. The album peaked at number 35 on the Top R&B/Hip-Hop Albums chart. The album's lead single "Who Knew?" was released on January 4, 2010. She released her third studio album, Unbelievable, on June 14, 2011, through Shanachie Records.

The singer's first EP, Ke'Ke', was released on May 6, 2014, through Aratek Entertainment. The lead single "Fall in Love" charted at number 20 on the Bubbling Under Hot 100. The second single "Lie Under You" (2014) failed to chart in the United States.

She released her fourth studio album, Rated Love, on April 22, 2016, through Aratek Entertainment. The lead single "Sexy Song" was released on November 10, 2015. The second single "Love Me" did not chart in the United States. On October 13, 2016, "Jodeci" was released as the third single and included on the deluxe version of the album, which was released on October 21, 2016.

Albums

Studio albums

Unreleased albums

EPs

Singles

As lead artist

As featured artist

Soundtrack appearances

Music videos

As lead artist

As featured artist

See also
List of songs recorded by Keke Wyatt

Notes

References

External links
Keke Wyatt on YouTube

Discographies of American artists
Rhythm and blues discographies
Soul music discographies